The Sentinel is an American, English language daily newspaper headquartered in Fairmont, Martin County, Minnesota.  It was founded in 1885 and is currently owned by Ogden Newspapers.

History
The Sentinel is descended from the following newspapers:
 The Daily Sentinel (1958-1966), publisher: Walter Mickelson, Jr. 
 Fairmont Daily Sentinel (1901-1958), publisher: Day & Aldrich 
 Martin County Independent (1896-1929), publisher: Martin County Independent Co 
 The Fairmont News (1885-1905), publisher: H.M. Blaisdell 
 The Martin County Democrat (1892-1896), publisher: St. John & Bilderbac

References

Newspapers published in Minnesota
1885 establishments in Minnesota
Martin County, Minnesota